This is a list of pizza restaurant franchises. Franchising is the practice of the right to use a firm's successful business model and brand for a prescribed period of time.

Pizza franchises

  America's Incredible Pizza Company
  Benedetti's Pizza
  Blackjack Pizza
  Blaze Pizza
  Boston Pizza
  California Pizza Kitchen
  Chuck E. Cheese's
  Čili
  Cottage Inn Pizza
  Debonairs Pizza
  Dodo Pizza
  Domino's Pizza
  Donatos Pizza
  DoubleDave's Pizzaworks
  Eagle Boys
  Four Star Pizza
  Godfather's Pizza
  Giordano's Pizzeria
  Greco Pizza Restaurant
  Happy's Pizza
  Kotipizza
  Ledo Pizza
  Little Caesars
  Marco's Pizza
  Mazzio's Italian Eatery
  MOD Pizza
  Monical's Pizza
  Mr. Pizza
  Mr. Gattis Pizza
  New York Pizza
  The Original Italian Pie
  Papa Gino's
  Papa John's Pizza
  Peter Piper Pizza
  Pizza California
  The Pizza Company
  Pizza Factory
  Pizza Fusion
  Pizza Haven
  Pizza Hut
  Pizza Inn
  Pizza-La
  Pizza Nova
  Pizza Pizza
  Pizza Ranch
  Roman's Pizza
  Rotolo’s Pizzeria
  Russo's New York Pizzeria
  Sandella's Flatbread Café
  Sbarro
  Shakey's Pizza
  ShowBiz Pizza Place
  Smokin' Joe's
  Straw Hat Pizza
  Telepizza
  Toppers Pizza
  Uncle Maddio's Pizza Joint
  Uno Pizzeria & Grill
  Vapiano
  Vocelli Pizza
  Your Pie
  Zpizza

By country
Pizza franchises by country:

See also

 List of franchises
 List of pizza chains
 List of Canadian pizza chains
 List of pizza chains of the United States
 Lists of restaurants

References

 
Lists of restaurants